The Via Dinarica is a network of long-distance hiking trails in the Dinaric Alps, and consists of the White Trail, Blue Trail and Green Trail. Via Dinarica connects the countries Slovenia, Croatia, Bosnia and Herzegovina, Montenegro, Serbia,Kosovo and Albania.

The Via Dinarica project was launched in 2010 with the aim of promoting and developing tourism in the Western Balkans. The Green and Blue trails are still under development (2020).

White Trail 
The White Trail (1,260.8 km) is the main route in Via Dinarica, and follows the main ridge of the Dinaric Alps. Along this route are the highest mountain peaks in each of the countries (except for Slovenia). The route starts in Razdrto at the foot of the Nanos plateau in Slovenia, and roughly follows the Croatian mountains of Velika Kapela, Velebit and Dinara. In Bosnia and Herzegovina, the trail passes through the Hercegovina region, and then through the mountains of Central Montenegro. The route ends in the Valbona valley in the Albanian Alps in Northern Albania.

Blue Trail 
The Blue Trail focuses on the coast of the Adriatic Sea, the islands, peninsulas and the somewhat lower mountains here.

Green Trail 
The Green Trail runs through the green and lush inland (for example the Lika region in Croatia and the central Bosnian regions) on the eastern slopes of the Dinaric Alps. The last part of the route also goes to western and south parts of Serbia.

References

External links 
 

Dinaric Alps
Hiking trails in Europe
Hiking trails in Croatia
Hiking trails in Slovenia
Hiking trails in Serbia